U.S. Route 202 (US 202) is a US Highway running from New Castle, Delaware, northeast to Bangor, Maine. The route runs through the southeastern part of the U.S. state of Pennsylvania, passing through the western and northern suburbs of Philadelphia in the Delaware Valley metropolitan area. US 202 serves largely as a toll-free bypass around the city, avoiding the busy traffic and congestion on Interstate 95 (I-95). It is signed north–south and follows a general southwest–northeast direction through the state, serving West Chester, King of Prussia, Bridgeport, Norristown, Montgomeryville, Doylestown, and New Hope. US 202 enters Pennsylvania from Delaware and heads north as a divided highway, where it becomes concurrent with US 322 at an intersection with US 1 in Painters Crossing. The two routes run north and become a freeway that bypasses West Chester to the east, with US 322 splitting from US 202. US 202 continues north and east along the freeway to King of Prussia, where it reverts to an at-grade divided highway following an interchange with I-76. The route becomes a one-way pair as it passes through Bridgeport and Norristown before both directions rejoin and the road continues northeast. US 202 follows an expressway-grade parkway between Montgomeryville and Doylestown prior to bypassing Doylestown to the south along a freeway. The route continues northeast as an at-grade road to New Hope, where it turns into a freeway again before it crosses the Delaware River on the New Hope–Lambertville Toll Bridge into New Jersey.

Route description

Delaware County

US 202 enters Pennsylvania from Delaware in Bethel Township, Delaware County, heading north on four-lane divided Wilmington-West Chester Pike. The road soon crosses into Concord Township and continues past commercial development, coming to an intersection with the western terminus of PA 491 and Beaver Valley Road in the community of Johnsons Corners. Past this intersection, the route splits into a one-way pair carrying two lanes in each direction and heads northwest past businesses and some homes, reaching a junction with Smithbridge Road in the community of Elam. Both directions of US 202 rejoin and the route continues north as a four-lane divided highway into Chadds Ford Township, where it becomes a five-lane road with a center left-turn lane and runs through more commercial areas. The road passes through the community of Brandywine Summit and transitions into a four-lane divided highway again, curving northwest and forming the border between Chadds Ford Township to the southwest and Concord Township to the northeast. The route comes to an intersection with US 1/US 322 (Baltimore Pike) in the community of Painters Crossing, where US 322 heads east along US 1 and turns northwest for a concurrency with US 202. US 202/US 322 heads northwest along a four-lane divided highway between businesses to the southwest and an office park to the northeast. The two routes come to an intersection with Oakland Road that has a southbound jughandle. The road continues into a mix of fields and commercial development and fully enters Chadds Ford Township, running a short distance to the west of the border with Thornbury Township. The two routes pass more development before reaching an intersection with Brintons Bridge Road/Dilworthtown Road.

Chester County
Upon crossing Brintons Bridge Road/Dilworthtown Road, US 202/US 322 enters Birmingham Township in Chester County and continues northwest along four-lane divided Wilmington Pike past businesses a short distance west of the Thornbury Township border. The road crosses into Thornbury Township and passes between suburban residential neighborhoods. The two routes continue into business areas and reach an intersection with PA 926 in the community of Darlington Corners. Upon crossing PA 926, US 202/US 322 heads into Westtown Township and passes between farmland to the west and wooded residential neighborhoods to the east. The road runs past more homes and commercial establishments, coming to a jughandle-controlled intersection at Stetson Middle School Drive/Skiles Boulevard. Past here, two routes head north-northwest through wooded areas of residences and businesses.

US 202/US 322 comes to a trumpet interchange with the south end of the West Chester Bypass, which bypasses the borough of West Chester to the east. At this point, US 202/US 322 heads northeast onto the four-lane divided West Chester Bypass into West Goshen Township, while US 322 Bus. continues north (west) on South High Street into West Chester. US 202/US 322 follows the bypass past industrial parks to an at-grade intersection with South Matlack Street, at which point the bypass becomes a four-lane freeway. The highway curves north and passes over the West Chester Railroad. Past this, the freeway comes to a diamond interchange at Westtown Road. US 202/US 322 continues north near residential neighborhoods and reaches a partial cloverleaf interchange with PA 3. Following this, the two routes come to a partial cloverleaf interchange serving Paoli Pike. The freeway continues near residential and commercial development before reaching a northbound exit and southbound entrance where US 322 splits from US 202 to continue west along the two-lane undivided West Chester Bypass to the north of West Chester.

Past the US 322 split, US 202 heads north as an unnamed four-lane freeway near business parks and passes to the west of Brandywine Airport, at which point it crosses the East Branch Chester Creek as it comes to a northbound exit and southbound entrance with the southern terminus of the PA 100 freeway. The route heads north-northeast near more business parks before it runs near wooded neighborhoods and reaches a diamond interchange at Boot Road. Following this, the freeway crosses into East Goshen Township and curves to the north-northwest, entering West Whiteland Township and passing through more wooded areas with nearby homes and commercial development. US 202 bends to the northeast and comes to a bridge over Amtrak's Keystone Corridor railroad line and an abandoned railroad line before it reaches an interchange with US 30 and the eastern terminus of US 30 Bus. at Lincoln Highway in the community of Glenloch. At this interchange, US 30 heads west on the Exton Bypass freeway and east on at-grade Lincoln Highway while US 30 Bus. heads west along Lincoln Highway. From here, US 202 widens to six lanes and crosses into East Whiteland Township. The highway heads to the northwest of the community of Frazer, running through a mix of fields, woods, and development. The freeway passes over the Chester Valley Trail before it comes to a diamond interchange at PA 401, where it also crosses Valley Creek. After this interchange, the route bends east and runs through wooded areas, heading across the creek again.

US 202 reaches an interchange with PA 29 in a commercial area to the south of the Great Valley Corporate Center and the Penn State Great Valley university campus. Following this, the freeway continues east-northeast near commercial development before crossing into Tredyffrin Township and running through wooded areas with nearby residential neighborhoods, with the Chester Valley Trail parallel to the south. Farther east, the route comes to a northbound exit and southbound entrance at Swedesford Road that provides access to PA 252. US 202 turns northeast and runs near business parks, curving east to reach a partial cloverleaf interchange at Chesterbrook Boulevard south of the community of Chesterbrook. A short distance later, the freeway has a southbound exit to southbound PA 252 and northbound entrance from northbound PA 252. The route heads east, with PA 252 closely parallel to the south, between residential areas to the north and business areas to the south. US 202 comes to an interchange serving PA 252 and North Valley Forge Road, with PA 252 heading north away from US 202. The freeway is paralleled with Swedesford Road as a frontage road on each side and the Chester Valley Trail to the south, with a northbound exit providing access to West Valley Road. Following this, the frontage roads end and the route runs east-northeast past office parks with the trail to the south. The freeway comes to a northbound exit providing access to eastbound I-76 (Schuylkill Expressway) and Devon Park Drive and a southbound entrance from Swedesford Road. A short distance later, US 202 reaches a trumpet interchange with the eastern terminus of the US 422 freeway. This interchange also has access from southbound US 202 to Swedesford Road via the ramp to US 422 westbound as well as from Devon Park Drive to northbound US 202 via the ramp from US 422 eastbound.

Montgomery County

Past the US 422 interchange, the US 202 freeway enters Upper Merion Township in Montgomery County and continues into the community of King of Prussia. The route runs past office parks and businesses south of the Village at Valley Forge, a residential and retail development which contains the King of Prussia Town Center lifestyle center, with the southbound ramp to westbound US 422 and Swedesford Road parallel to the southbound lanes. The freeway comes to a modified cloverleaf interchange with I-76 (Schuylkill Expressway). This interchange provides all connections between I-76 and US 202, with the ramp from northbound US 202 to eastbound I-76 splitting from US 202 south of the US 422 interchange. In the southbound direction, a parallel ramp splits off to serve eastbound I-76, westbound US 422, and Swedesford Road. I-76 heads west to provide access to the Pennsylvania Turnpike at the western terminus of I-276 at the Valley Forge interchange and east to provide access to the city of Philadelphia. Following this interchange, the freeway ends and US 202 becomes West Dekalb Pike, an eight-lane divided highway with at-grade intersections. The route heads into business areas and intersects Gulph Road, at which point it passes southeast of the King of Prussia shopping mall. At the junction with Mall Boulevard/Shaffer Road, the roadway reduces to five lanes with two northbound lanes and three southbound lanes. Following the Allendale Road/Forge Road intersection, the divided road narrows to four lanes, with two lanes in each direction. The route runs between commercial establishments to the northwest and residential areas to the southeast, coming to a bridge over the Pennsylvania Turnpike (I-276). US 202 continues southeast of a neighborhood and heads past more businesses, reaching an intersection with Henderson Road. From here, the route becomes East Dekalb Pike and runs through more commercial areas, crossing the under-construction Chester Valley Trail and bending to the north-northeast.

US 202 splits into a one-way pair utilizing two-way roads, with the northbound direction turning east to follow four-lane divided East Dekalb Pike while southbound US 202 follows the four-lane divided Bridgeport Bypass; this intersection has a jughandle from southbound US 202 to northbound US 202. Northbound US 202 heads northeast into the borough of Bridgeport and becomes two-lane undivided Dekalb Street, passing over SEPTA's Norristown High Speed Line north of the DeKalb Street station before heading past residences and a few businesses. The northbound direction crosses an abandoned railroad line before it intersects PA 23 and widens to four lanes, coming to a bridge over Norfolk Southern's Harrisburg Line and running past more development to the Schuylkill River. Southbound US 202 heads south along the four-lane divided highway from the Schuylkill River into Upper Merion Township through wooded areas with nearby commercial development, passing over the Harrisburg Line before coming to a southbound exit to PA 23 and a northbound entrance from Ross Road, with this interchange utilizing a portion of the incomplete Schuylkill Parkway freeway stub. At the PA 23 interchange, the road crosses into Bridgeport. Past this, southbound US 202 crosses over the under-construction Chester Valley Trail and re-enters Upper Merion Township as it passes under Boro Line Road. Both directions of US 202 cross the Schuylkill River into the borough of Norristown. Northbound US 202 crosses the river on the Dekalb Veterans Memorial Bridge before it passes under SEPTA's Manayunk/Norristown Line and the Schuylkill River Trail east of SEPTA's Norristown Transportation Center serving the Manayunk/Norristown Line and the terminus of the Norristown High Speed Line. Southbound US 202 crosses under the Schuylkill River Trail before it heads onto the William F. Dannehower Memorial Bridge. The route passes over Washington Street and the Manayunk/Norristown Line before heading over the Schuylkill River. The route enters West Norriton Township and passes over Norfolk Southern's Norristown Line and wooded Barbadoes Island before heading over more of the river and into Upper Merion Township. From here, northbound US 202 crosses Lafayette Street and becomes one-way with two lanes of traffic on Dekalb Street, passing businesses in the downtown area of Norristown, where it crosses Main Street and Airy Street. Southbound US 202 heads southwest into commercial areas in downtown Norristown along Markley Street, a three-lane road with a center-left turn lane, running to the east of the terminus of the Manayunk/Norristown Line at the Elm Street station at Elm Street. At this point, the road begins to parallel the Manayunk/Norristown Line, widening to a four-lane divided highway between Elm and Marshall streets. Southbound US 202 crosses under Airy Street and passes to the east of the Main Street station along the Manayunk/Norristown Line at Main Street. Past downtown Norristown, US 202 continues northeast through urban residential areas with some businesses, following Dekalb Street northbound, which is one-way with two lanes of traffic, and Markley Street southbound, which is three lanes wide with a center turn lane. At the northern border of Norristown, southbound US 202 rejoins northbound US 202 at Dekalb Street; southbound US 202 splits from Dekalb Street by following Johnson Highway, a three-lane road with a center left-turn lane, northwest between Dekalb Street and Markley Street along the border between Norristown to the southwest and East Norriton Township to the northeast.

From here, US 202 heads northeast into East Norriton Township along two-lane undivided Dekalb Pike, passing through suburban residential neighborhoods and running through the community of Grand View Heights. The road continues into business areas and passes to the southeast of Suburban Community Hospital, widening into a four-lane divided highway and coming to an intersection with Germantown Pike. The route becomes a three-lane road with a center left-turn lane before it narrows to two lanes and runs through wooded residential neighborhoods. US 202 reaches a junction with Township Line Road in the community of Washington Square, at which point it crosses into Whitpain Township. The road gains a center turn lane and passes businesses, intersecting Swede Road.  The route continues past a mix of residential and commercial development and comes to a bridge over the Pennsylvania Turnpike Northeast Extension (I-476). US 202 narrows to two lanes and reaches an intersection with PA 73 in the community of Center Square. From here, the road runs past businesses before heading near residential subdivisions. The route passes to the northwest of Montgomery County Community College and gains a second northbound lane before it reaches a junction with Morris Road in the community of Franklintown. US 202 becomes four lanes and passes residential development, soon narrowing to two lanes and crossing Township Line Road into Lower Gwynedd Township. The road runs through wooded areas with some homes, heading across the Wissahickon Creek. The route widens to four lanes and passes under SEPTA's Lansdale/Doylestown Line. US 202 curves north and crosses Sumneytown Pike in the community of Gwynedd. The road continues through wooded areas of development as a two-lane undivided road and turns northeast, running along the border between Upper Gwynedd Township to the northwest and Lower Gwynedd Township to the southeast as a five-lane road with a center left-turn lane.

US 202 becomes a four-lane divided highway and comes to an intersection with the southern terminus of US 202 Bus., where that route heads north on Dekalb Pike. Here, US 202 turns into a four-lane undivided expressway-grade parkway dedicated as the George A. Penglase Memorial Parkway. The US 202 parkway features landscaping and split-rail fences and is designated as a Pennsylvania Scenic Byway known as the U.S. Route 202 Parkway Scenic Byway; as such, billboards are banned. Soon after beginning, the parkway comes to an intersection with PA 63. Upon crossing PA 63, the US 202 parkway enters Montgomery Township in the North Penn Valley region and becomes paralleled by a multi-use trail called the US 202 Parkway Trail to the east of the road. The road winds north near residential and commercial development, intersecting Knapp Road. The route curves to the northeast and comes to an interchange with PA 309 (Bethlehem Pike) south of the community of Montgomeryville consisting of a ramp from northbound PA 309 to northbound US 202 and a two-way quadrant ramp on the northwest side of the interchange providing all other movements. At this point, the US 202 Parkway Trail crosses under the parkway at the bridge over PA 309, heading to the west side of the road and looping to pass over PA 309 on the bridge with the parkway. Following this, US 202 continues near development, heading across the trail again at the Costco Drive/Terrace Way intersection. The parkway reaches a junction with PA 463, at which point it narrows to two lanes. The road winds northeast through wooded areas with nearby residential neighborhoods and comes to an intersection with County Line Road, where it briefly widens to four lanes.

Bucks County
Upon crossing County Line Road, the US 202 parkway leaves the North Penn Valley region and enters Warrington Township in Bucks County, narrowing back to two lanes. The route and the US 202 Parkway Trail wind north through a mix of fields and woods. The road curves northeast and comes to an intersection with PA 152. The route heads northeast near residential neighborhoods and some woodland, passing under Pickertown Road before reaching a junction with Bristol Road. At this point, the trail heads to the west side of US 202 and the parkway continues into Doylestown Township, curving east and coming to the  
1st Lt. Travis L. Manion Memorial Bridge over the Neshaminy Creek. The road heads through a mix of fields and woods and turns to the northeast, passing over Almshouse Road. The route curves back to the east and runs through more woodland, coming to an intersection with Lower State Road. Here, the US 202 Parkway Trail crosses to the south of the roadway. US 202 continues along the parkway past residential subdivisions and crosses under Wells Road before it curves northeast, heading northwest of Doylestown Central Park. The road passes over New Britain Road, at which point the parallel US 202 Parkway Trail ends.

The parkway ends and US 202 transitions into a four-lane freeway, coming to a cloverleaf interchange with the PA 611 freeway. The US 202 freeway bypasses the borough of Doylestown to the south and runs through wooded areas, reaching a diamond interchange with South Main Street that serves the borough. Here, the roadway passes through a small section of the borough of Doylestown before heading back into Doylestown Township and running through woodland with nearby residential development. The freeway section of US 202 ends at an at-grade intersection with East State Street.

At this point, US 202 continues as four-lane divided Buckingham Pike, crossing PA 313 and entering Buckingham Township. Past this intersection, the road becomes two-lane undivided Doylestown Buckingham Pike and it heads east-northeast through a mix of wooded residential neighborhoods and some fields, bending to the east and crossing Watson Creek. The route continues through woodland with housing developments, curving to the northeast. US 202 heads east into the community of Buckingham, where it becomes a divided highway and comes to an intersection with PA 413. The road passes more development and becomes undivided, reaching a junction with PA 263. This junction has no access from northbound PA 263 to southbound US 202; access is provided via PA 413. At this point, US 202 turns northeast for a concurrency with PA 263 on two-lane undivided York Road. The two routes head through fields and woodland with some development, passing through the community of Holicong and crossing Lahaska Creek.

Upon reaching the unincorporated village of Lahaska, the two routes split, with US 202 heading east-northeast onto Lower York Road. The road passes between Peddler's Village to the north and the Penn's Purchase Factory Stores to the south, crossing Street Road into Solebury Township. The route runs past residential subdivisions before it heads east through a mix of fields and woods with some residential and commercial development. US 202 crosses Aquetong Road in the community of Aquetong and bends east-northeast through wooded areas. The road heads between residential areas to the north and businesses to the south, gaining a second southbound lane and then a median before coming to an intersection with the southern terminus of PA 179, which heads east (north) into the borough of New Hope. Here, the route turns northeast and becomes a two-lane undivided road, passing near more development as it heads through the northwest corner of New Hope. US 202 comes to a two-way ramp called US-202 Spur that heads east to provide access to PA 32, at which point US 202 curves north into Solebury Township and runs near development. The route turns east and becomes a four-lane freeway, reaching a southbound exit and northbound entrance with PA 32. US 202 has a southbound toll plaza and passes over the Delaware Canal and the Delaware River on the New Hope–Lambertville Toll Bridge, where it leaves Pennsylvania for New Jersey.

History

The Dekalb Pike portion of US 202 was originally chartered as a turnpike called the Norristown, Bridgeport, and King of Prussia Turnpike in 1848. Construction on the turnpike began in 1853 and shares for the turnpike company sold for $10 each. Investors of the turnpike did not receive a dividend until 1885; shortly after that, the Dekalb Pike was turned over to public control and the tolls were removed.

Before the creation of the U.S. highway system, the route had been part of PA 29 between the Delaware state line and West Chester and PA 52 between West Chester and the New Jersey state line. US 122 was created in 1926, connecting US 22 at Whitehouse, New Jersey, with Wilmington, Delaware. In 1934, US 122 became part of US 202.

US 202 followed a different alignment in Chester County before the freeway alignment was built. The former alignment had US 202 separating from US 322 and the West Chester Bypass onto Paoli Pike to Paoli, then overlapping US 30 in Paoli and then turning north on what later became PA 252.

In the early 1960s, a four-lane freeway was proposed that would follow the US 202 corridor. It was to serve as an outer beltway around the Philadelphia area, similar to the Capital Beltway that encircles Washington, D.C.

The Pennsylvania Department of Transportation (PennDOT) divided the proposed US 202 freeway into the following eight sections:
Section 100: Concord Township, Delaware County, to West Goshen Township, Chester County (approximately eight miles)
Section 200: West Goshen Township, Chester County, to West Whiteland Township, Chester County (approximately six miles)
Section 300: East Whiteland Township, Chester County, to Tredyffrin Township, Chester County (approximately seven miles)
Section 400: Tredyffrin Township, Chester County, to Upper Merion Township, Montgomery County (approximately five miles)
Section 500: Upper Merion Township, Montgomery County, to Norristown, Montgomery County (approximately five miles)
Section 600: East Norriton Township, Montgomery County, to Montgomery Township, Montgomery County (approximately nine miles)
Section 700: Montgomery Township, Montgomery County, to Doylestown Township, Bucks County (approximately nine miles)
Section 800: Doylestown Township, Bucks County, to New Hope, Bucks County (approximately ten miles)

The road was at the front of discussion and controversies around Bucks and Montgomery counties for almost forty years. It was originally planned as a four-lane freeway, but in 2005 the plan was changed to a two- to four-lane parkway after funding for the road was cut. Construction began in November 2008 on the portion between PA 63 and PA 463, with construction on the portion from PA 463 to the interchange with PA 611 following in January 2010. Completion of the parkway was initially expected by late 2010 with a planned opening date in early 2011. The parkway was completed by the end of 2010 between PA 63 and PA 463; this section remained closed to traffic until the remainder of the road was complete, with the exception of a small portion near PA 463. Construction of the US 202 parkway cost $200 million. The parkway opened to traffic at 2 p.m. on December 3, 2012. Lieutenant Governor Jim Cawley cut the ribbon to open the parkway. The parkway was built with four lanes from PA 63 to PA 463 and two lanes from PA 463 to PA 611. It has  shoulders, a  walking path on the side, and a  speed limit. The US 202 parkway was designated as a Pennsylvania Scenic Byway; as such, billboards are banned. On July 7, 2011, an act of the Pennsylvania General Assembly was passed naming the US 202 parkway the George A. Penglase Memorial Parkway in honor of a business leader from Bucks County who pushed for a bypass of US 202.

Prior to the opening of the parkway, US 202 followed Dekalb Pike, PA 309, Doylestown Road, Butler Avenue, State Street, and PA 611 between Montgomery Township and Doylestown. After US 202 was rerouted to the parkway, the former alignment was designated as SR 2202 in Montgomery County and SR 4202 in Bucks County. As a result of the removal of the US 202 designation from the former alignment, several businesses along the former route saw declines in customers. In 2014, several businesses along the former US 202 pushed for the state to designate the road as US 202 Bus. in order to help them gain customers. The American Association of State Highway and Transportation Officials Special Committee on U.S. Route Numbering approved the US 202 Bus. designation on May 13, 2015.

PennDOT made plans to widen two sections of US 202, from US 30 in East Whiteland Township to North Valley Road in Tredyffrin Township in Chester County, costing $175 million, and from Johnson Highway on the border of Norristown and East Norriton Township to PA 309 in Montgomeryville in Montgomery County, costing $130 million. Preliminary work on the US 30 to North Valley Road widening project involved the replacement of three bridges over US 202 between March 2007 and fall 2008, with an additional four bridges replaced or modified between February 2008 and summer 2010. Construction on the actual widening of both segments was expected to start in 2009. However, PennDOT indefinitely suspended construction on both segments due to needing to use money to repair structurally deficient bridges.  Work on widening and reconstructing US 202 from four to six lanes between the Mill Road overpass and North Valley Road began in April 2011, with completion in September 2014. Construction on widening and reconstructing the highway between US 30 and the Mill Road overpass started in April 2013 and was completed in August 2016. 

On January 28, 2019, construction began on widening the section of US 202 from Township Line Road in East Norriton Township to Morris Road in Whitpain Township from two lanes to a five-lane road with a center left-turn lane. On February 3, 2020, construction began to widen US 202 between Morris Road in Whitpain Township and Swedesford Road in Lower Gwynedd Township to five lanes with a center left-turn lane. Construction on widening US 202 between Johnson Highway and Township Line Road in East Norriton Township began on June 23, 2021. Completion of the entire widening project of US 202 between Johnson Highway in East Norriton Township and Swedesford Road in Lower Gwynedd Township is expected in 2027.

PennDOT has realigned the intersection where US 202 meets State Street at the north end of the freeway in Doylestown into a T-intersection with a traffic signal, with the roadway gradually decreasing from four lanes to three (one lane each direction and a center turn lane), then to two, through Buckingham Township.

Between February 2013 and September 2015, a construction project rebuilt the section of southbound US 202 along Markley Street between Johnson Highway and Elm Street in Norristown into a three-lane road with a center left-turn lane. The section of southbound US 202 along Johnson Highway was also restriped to include a center left-turn lane. In January 2020, construction began to rebuild and widen the section of southbound US 202 along Markley Street between Elm Street and the Dannehower Bridge in Norristown. Construction was planned to be completed in the later part of 2022.

Major intersections

See also

Special routes of U.S. Route 202

References

External links

Pennsylvania Highways: US 202
US 202 at AARoads.com
Pennsylvania Roads - US 202
The Roads of Metro Philadelphia: US 202 Expressway-Pennsylvania
U.S. 202 Section 700 site

02-2
 Pennsylvania
Transportation in Delaware County, Pennsylvania
Transportation in Chester County, Pennsylvania
Transportation in Montgomery County, Pennsylvania
Transportation in Bucks County, Pennsylvania